Cembrene A, or sometimes neocembrene, is a natural monocyclic diterpene isolated from corals of the genus Nephthea.  It is a colorless oil with a faint wax-like odor.

Cembrene A itself has little importance as a chemical entity, being a trail pheromone for termites;  however, the chemical structure of cembrene is central to a very wide variety of other natural products found both in plants and in animals.

Cembrenes are biosynthesized by macrocyclization of geranylgeranyl pyrophosphate.

References 

Diterpenes
Alkene derivatives
Insect ecology
Insect pheromones
Cycloalkenes